Kiratina is a settlement in Kenya's Kiambu County in the former Central Province (Kenya).

References 

Populated places in Central Province (Kenya)